The Udi Hills, or Ugwueme and Udi hills, is located in the North Local Government Area of Enugu State, Nigeria. These hills rise hundreds of meters above sea level.

History
In 1908, the Udi hills attracted a British expedition team on its way from Akwa to the Middle Belt, and in 1909, the British colonial government to Nigeria sent a team of mining engineers to Enugu to prospect for silver. Once there, they settled in Ngwo at the top of Milliken Hill after discovering coal. On its slope to the south they set up another settlement for African laborers known as Alfred Camp or Ugwu Alfred. In 1915, Udi hills was the site for the first coal mine to be opened in Nigeria but was closed two years later and replaced with the Iva Valley mine.

References 

Enugu State
Hills of Nigeria